Jielong 3 (meaning "agile dragon", also known as Smart Dragon 3, SD-3), is a solid fueled orbital launch vehicle developed by China Academy of Launch Vehicle Technology's subsidiary China Rocket to launch up to 1500 kg to a 500 km altitude sun-synchronous orbit. The rocket is 31 meters tall, 2.65 meters in diameter and weighs 145 metric tons. It is a solid fuel, 4 stage orbital rocket. The fairing diameter is 3.35 m. It is uses the same rocket motors as the Zhongke-1 (ZK-1, Lijian-1) rocket.

The maiden flight of Jielong 3 on 9 December 2022, 06:35 UTC was successful. It delivered fourteen small satellites into polar orbit. The satellites were Jilin-1 Gaofen-03D-44-50 and Pingtai-01A01, HEAD 2H, Jinzijing Qilu-1 05 and 06, Tianqi 07, Huoju 1 (Torch 1) and CAS 5A. The launch took place from a floating platform off Yantai, Shandong.

List of launches

References

Vehicles introduced in 2022
2022 in China
2022 in technology